Scapuzzi is an Italian surname. Notable people with the surname include:

Bartolomeo Scapuzzi (born 1750), Italian Baroque painter
Luca Scapuzzi (born 1991), Italian footballer

See also
Capuzzi

Italian-language surnames